The Dr. S.W. Hill Drug Store in Regent, North Dakota, United States, was built in 1910.  It is one of eight buildings that make up the Hettinger County Historical Society Museum.  It is an example of Early Commercial architecture.  It was listed on the National Register of Historic Places in 1980.  In 1980 it was serving as the Hettinger County Historical Society Museum.

References

External links
 Hettinger County Historical Society - photos and information

Commercial buildings completed in 1910
Commercial buildings on the National Register of Historic Places in North Dakota
Buildings designated early commercial in the National Register of Historic Places
History museums in North Dakota
Museums in Hettinger County, North Dakota
National Register of Historic Places in Hettinger County, North Dakota
Defunct pharmacies of the United States
1910 establishments in North Dakota
Pharmacies on the National Register of Historic Places